Morning Chapel Christian Methodist Episcopal Church is a historic Christian Methodist Episcopal church located at 903 E. Third Street in Fort Worth, Texas.

It was built in 1934 and added to the National Register of Historic Places in 1999, where it is listed as the Morning Chapel Colored Methodist Episcopal Church (its name until 1954) at 901 E. Third Street.

See also

National Register of Historic Places listings in Tarrant County, Texas
I.M. Terrell High School

References

External links

Architecture in Fort Worth: Morning Chapel C.M.E. Church

Christian Methodist Episcopal churches
National Register of Historic Places in Fort Worth, Texas
Gothic Revival church buildings in Texas
Churches completed in 1934
Churches in Fort Worth, Texas
1934 establishments in Texas